Carson Graham Secondary is a public high school in the city of North Vancouver, British Columbia and part of School District 44 North Vancouver.

History 

The school opened September 15, 1965, and is named after Dr. Carson Graham. In 2009, Carson Graham only offered grades eleven and twelve because of the construction work being done. All of the grade eight, nine, and ten students were sent to Balmoral Secondary.

Academics 
Carson Graham offers courses in a variety of subjects, including the humanities, sciences, language arts, business, fine arts and performing arts, engineering, leadership, and computer technology. Carson Graham is also an International Baccalaureate MYP and DP school.

Safe and Active School Travel Program 
In 2016–2017 the school was the first North Vancouver secondary school to participate in the Safe and Active School Travel Program, an 18-month program looking at school and neighbourhood transportation modes, safety, and opportunities.

Notable alumni

Brent Charleton, former Australian National Basketball League player
Paris Jackson, former CFL football player,
Karen Magnussen, world figure skating champion 
Jerome Pathon, former NFL player
Gabor Mate, former Carson English teacher, writer and physician
Gregor Robertson, former mayor of Vancouver
Nina Kiri, actor
Glen Suitor, former CFL football player and sports broadcaster for TSN
Anthony Sedlak, winner of Food Network's Superstar Chef Challenge II
Shane Bunting, rapper Madchild,
Rowan Wick, MLB pitcher in San Diego Padres organization
Fred Winters, Olympian and professional volleyball player
Dominique Termansen, former CFL football player

Athletics 

The school has teams in football, rugby union, rowing, wrestling, volleyball, badminton, field hockey, basketball, swimming, mountain biking, ultimate frisbee, and soccer.

Past championships include:
 Rugby
AAA Boys Rugby Provincial Champions: 2008, 2006, 2002, 1996
AAA Girls Rugby Provincial Champions: 2017, 2016, 2012, 2011, 2010, 2009, 2008, 2007, 2006, 2004
Wrestling
Provincial Boys Wrestling Champions: 1990 1992 1993 1995
Provincial Girls Wrestling Champions: 2009 2008, 2006, 2004
Football
AAA Football Provincial Champions: 2001
AA Football Provincial Champions 2021, 2015
A Football Provincial Champions 1993
Soccer
AAA Boys Soccer Provincial Champions: 2001
Soccer Provincial Champions : 1979–1980
Field Hockey
AAA Women's field hockey Provincial Champions: 2011

The school's football, rugby, soccer, and field hockey teams play at Confederation Park.

Every year, the Carson Graham Eagles football team play their rivals, the Handsworth Royals, in the Buchanan Bowl. The very first Buchanan Bowl was played in 1987 and is named after Mr. James Buchanan, a teacher and administrator who worked at both schools and died in 1986.

See also 
Balmoral Jr Secondary School - Balmoral campus of Carson Graham school

References

External links 
 School District 44 Home Page

School Reports - Ministry of Education
 Class Size
 Satisfaction Survey
 School Performance
 Skills Assessment

High schools in British Columbia
International Baccalaureate schools in British Columbia
North Vancouver (city)
Educational institutions established in 1965
1965 establishments in British Columbia